Abbey Ales is an English brewery located in city of Bath, England. It was founded in 1997 by Alan Morgan.

Beers
Bellringer is a cask beer with an alcohol by volume of 4.2%, launched at the Bath Beer Festival  in 1997.  It was awarded 'Beer of the Festival' at the Cotswolds CAMRA Festival in July 1998, the Devizes CAMRA Festival in May 1999, the Bath Beer Festival in October 2000, and was a finalist in the Champion Beer of Britain competition in 2001.

Other beers which are brewed on a seasonal basis, or for special occasions, include:
 Mild 4.0% abv
 Chorister 4.5% abv
 Bath Star 4.6% abv
 Resurrection 4.6% abv
 Steeple Jack 4.7% abv
 Salvation 4.8% abv
 Twelfth Night 5.0% abv, a dark bitter produced at Christmas.
 White Friar 5.0% abv
 Black Friar 5.3% abv
 Bellringer Maximus 5.0% abv, a new version of the Bellringer bitter, launched at the Bath Beer Festival in October 2007, to celebrate the brewery's 10th anniversary.

The brewery also owns the Star Inn, Coeur de Lion, The Assembly Inn, and the Trinity pubs in Bath.

References

External links
 Abbey Ales website

Companies based in Bath, Somerset
Food and drink companies established in 1997
Breweries in England
British companies established in 1827
1827 establishments in England